Acholeplasma are wall-less bacteria in the Mollicutes class. They include saprotrophic or pathogenic species. There are 15 recognised species. The G+C content is low, ranging from 26 - 36% (mol%). The genomes of Acholeplasma species range in size from 1.5 to 1.65 Mbp. Cholesterol is not required for growth. The species are found on animals, and some plants and insects. The optimum growth temperature is 30 to 37 degrees Celsius.

Acholeplasma laidlawii is a common contaminant of cell culture media products, and has also been used in extensive studies of lipid polymorphism because this organism alters its ratio of MGlcDG (monoglucosyl diacylglycerol) to DGlcDG (diglucosyl diacylglycerol) in response to growth conditions.

Phylogeny

See also
 List of bacteria genera
 List of bacterial orders

References

Mollicutes
Cryozoa
Bacteria genera